Our Lady of Providence is a Roman Catholic devotion to Mary, the mother of Jesus.

Our Lady of Providence may also refer to:

 Our Lady of Divine Providence School, Metairie, Louisiana
 Our Lady of Providence Elementary School, Ontario
 Our Lady of Providence Junior-Senior High School, Clarksville, Indiana
 Our Lady of Providence Seminary, Providence, Rhode Island